The Music Is You: A Tribute To John Denver is an album consisting of songs originally performed by country and folk singer-songwriter John Denver. It was released on April 2, 2013 by ATO Records. Denver died in October 1997 when the single engine plane he was piloting crashed off the coast of California. The album has been praised by some as a way to help Denver's catalogue reach a new, younger audience.

Track listing
"Leaving on a Jet Plane" – My Morning Jacket
"Take Me to Tomorrow" – Dave Matthews
"All of My Memories" – Kathleen Edwards
"Prisoners" – J Mascis and Sharon Van Etten
"Sunshine on My Shoulders" – Train
"Back Home Again" – Old Crow Medicine Show
"This Old Guitar" – Lucinda Williams
"Some Days Are Diamonds" – Amos Lee
"Rocky Mountain High" – Allen Stone
"Annie's Song" – Brett Dennen and Milow
"Looking For Space" – Evan Dando
"Take Me Home, Country Roads" – Brandi Carlile and Emmylou Harris
"The Eagle and the Hawk" – Blind Pilot
"I Guess He'd Rather Be in Colorado" – Mary Chapin Carpenter
"Darcy Farrow" – Josh Ritter and Barnstar!
"Wooden Indian" – Edward Sharpe and the Magnetic Zeros

Personnel
"Leaving on a Jet Plane"
 Produced, mixed, engineered by Jim James
 Performed by My Morning Jacket
"Take Me to Tomorrow"
Produced by Dave Matthews
Engineered by Rob Evans
Vocals and guitar by Dave Matthews
"All Of My Memories"
Produced by Jim James
Engineered by Kevin Ratterman
Mixed by Kevin Ratterman and Jim James
Lead vocals, acoustic guitar, and violin by Kathleen Edwards
Background vocals, bass, and FX by Jim James
Drums, piano, and FX by Kevin Ratterman
"Prisoners"
Performed by J Mascis and Sharon Van Etten
Mixed by Mark Alan Miller
Recorded by Mark Allen Miller and Aaron Dessner
"Sunshine On My Shoulders"
Produced by Train and Ross Petersen
Engineered and mixed by Ross Petersen
Additional percussion by Ross Petersen
Mastered by Ryan Smith
"Back Home Again"
Banjo and vocals by Critter Fuqua
Guitjo and vocals by Kevin Haynes
Bass and vocals by Morgan Jahnig
Dobro and vocals by Gill Landry
Guitar and vocals by Chance Mccoy
Fiddle and lead vocals by Ketch Secor
Mandolin and vocals by Cory Younts
"This Old Guitar"
Vocals and acoustic guitar by Lucinda Williams
Electric guitar by Doug Pettibone
Bass by David Sutton
Drums by Butch Norton
"Some Days Are Diamonds"
Guitar and vocals by Amos Lee
Recorded by Chris Allen
"Rocky Mountain High"
Engineered by Chris Rahm
Vocals and guitar by Allen Stone
Guitars by Trevor Larkin
Bass by Brent Rusinow
"Annie's Song"
Recorded, mixed, and produced by John Alagia
Engineered by Brad Conrad
Vocals, electric & acoustic guitar, ukulele and xylophone by Brett Dennen
Bass, percussion, and pump organ by John Alagia
Vocals by Milow
"Looking For Space"
Recorded, engineered, and produced by Jimmy Parr
Lead vocals and guitars by Evan Dando
Bass by Jimmy Parr
Drums by Chris Anzalone
Background vocals by Christian Mcneill and Erich Leuning
"Take Me Home, Country Roads"
Produced, recorded, and engineered by Brandi Carlile, The Twins, and Buddy Miller
Mixed by Trina Shoemaker
Vocals, organ, piano, and percussion by Brandi Carlile
Vocals by Emmylou Harris
Bass, percussion, and vocals by Phil Hanseroth
Guitars, percussion, and vocals by Tim Hanseroth
"The Eagle And The Hawk"
Produced and recorded by Israel Nebeker
Mixed by Jesse Lauter
Vocals, ukulele and electric guitar by Israel Nebeker
Drums by Ryan Dobrowski
Double Bass, harmonium, baritone ukulele, and vocals by Luke Ydstie
Mountain dulcimer and vocals by Kati Claborn
"I Guess He'd Rather Be In Colorado"
Produced by Mary Chapin Carpenter
Recorded and mixed by John Jennings
Mastered by Mike Monseur
Vocals and acoustic guitar by Mary Chapin Carpenter
Electric guitar and upright bass by John Jennings
"Darcy Farrow"
Produced by Zachariah Hickman
Arranged by Josh Ritter and Barnstar!
Recorded and mixed by Dan Cardinal
Fiddle by Jake Armerding
Mandolin by Taylor Armerding
Guitar and harmony vocals by Mark Erelli
Upright bass by Zachariah Hickman
Guitar and vocals by Josh Ritter
Banjo by Charlie Rose
"Wooden Indian"
Performed by Edward Sharpe and the Magnetic Zeros
Additional personnel
Produced by Brian Schwartz and Jon Salter
Mastered by Greg Calbi
John Denver estate management by Brian Schwartz and Amy Abrams
John Denver estate business management by Howard Grossman and Eric Wasserman
John Denver estate legal representation by Jay Cooper
Product management by Kirby Lee
Art direction and design by Michael Carney
Photography courtesy of the John Denver estate

Chart performance

References

ATO Records albums
John Denver tribute albums
2013 compilation albums